Crypsis has two distinct meanings in biology:

 organisms that hide themselves: crypsis
 organisms that are difficult to distinguish:  crypsis (taxonomy)

See also
Cryptozoology